People in Need ( or ) is a 1925 German silent war film directed by Wolfgang Neff and starring Hermine Sterler, Werner Pittschau and Claire Rommer.

The film's sets were designed by the art director Willi Herrmann.

Cast
 Hermine Sterler as Elisabeth Ditten, Gutsbesitzerin
 Werner Pittschau as Horst - Elisabeths Sohn
 Claire Rommer as Herta - Elisabeths Nichte
 Heinrich Peer as Der Oberst
 Josef Breitbart as Ein Offiziersbursche
 Wilhelm Diegelmann as Der Pastor
 Eva Speyer as Die Pastorin
 Sophie Pagay as Die Magd
 Eduard von Winterstein as General Samsonoff
 Gustav Adolf Semler as Graf Wolkonski - Samsonoffs Adjutant
 Karl Beckersachs as Jergunoff - russischer Stabsarzt
 Aruth Wartan as Russischer Generalstabchef
 Ernst Rückert as Russischer Leutnant
 Traute Gerlach as Ein Bauernmädchen

References

Bibliography
 Kester, Bernadette. Film Front Weimar: Representations of the First World War in German films of the Weimar Period (1919–1933). Amsterdam University Press, 2003.

External links

1925 films
Films of the Weimar Republic
German silent feature films
Films directed by Wolfgang Neff
German war films
1925 war films
German black-and-white films
World War I films set on the Eastern Front
1920s German films